Acontias grayi, Gray's dwarf legless skink, is a species of lizard in the family Scincidae. It is endemic to Western Cape, South Africa.

References

Acontias
Skinks of Africa
Endemic reptiles of South Africa
Reptiles described in 1887
Taxa named by George Albert Boulenger
Fauna of South Africa
Endemic fauna of South Africa